Arar Lugole is a town in the southern Hiran region of Somalia.

References
Arar Lugole

Populated places in Hiran, Somalia